The Langley River is an  tributary of the Cloquet River of Minnesota, United States, north of Two Harbors.

See also
List of rivers of Minnesota

References

Minnesota Watersheds
USGS Hydrologic Unit Map - State of Minnesota (1974)

Rivers of Minnesota
Rivers of Lake County, Minnesota